The Rocher Lake is a freshwater body of the Broadback River watershed, of the municipality of Eeyou Istchee James Bay (municipality), in the Nord-du-Québec, in Quebec, in Canada.

Forestry is the main economic activity of the sector. Recreational tourism activities come second with a large downstream navigable body of water, especially the lower Nipukatasi River and the Broadback River.

The hydrographic slope of lake Rocher is accessible via the forest road R1023 (east-west) from the west, passing north of “Île au Pain de Sucre”, then heading north-east to pass from the West of lake Rocher; the R1023 connects the "James Bay Road" (North-South direction) that comes from Matagami. Another road (North-South direction) passes on the east side of Lake Rocher and on the west side of Amisquioumisca Lake.

The surface of Lake Rocher is usually frozen from early November to mid-May, however, safe ice circulation is generally from mid-November to mid-April.

Geography

Toponymy
This hydronym evokes the work of life of Robert Rocher, former member of the Geographical Survey of Quebec, in 1917.

The toponym Lac Rocher was formalized on December 5, 1968 at the Commission de toponymie du Québec, at the creation of this commission.

Notes and references

See also 

Eeyou Istchee James Bay
Broadback River drainage basin
Rock
Jamésie